Hilary Davies (born 1954) is an English poet, critic and translator. She has also taught extensively.

Biography
Davies was born in London to Anglo-Welsh parents, and was educated at Bromley High School and Wadham College, Oxford, where she was among the first intake of women students, graduating in French and German in 1974. She was married to the poet Sebastian Barker (1945-2014) from 1998 until his death in 2014.

Davies won an Eric Gregory Award in 1983, and was chairman of the Poetry Society in 1992-93. She taught for 30 years at St Paul's Girls' School, being head of modern languages for 19 years, until taking early retirement in 2011 to spend more time on her poetry. In 2012-2016 she held a Royal Literary Fund Fellowship at King's College London.

Reception
The Times Literary Supplement, in a review of Davies' poem "The Ophthalmologist", writes "we might read this whole piece as an extended metaphor for the agony and ecstasy intrinsic to every creative act."  A Contemporary Poetry Review review of New British Poetry discussing poet omissions from the collection writes "I, for one, particularly regret the neglect of the underrated Hilary Davies, whose first book, The Shanghai Owner of the Bonsai Shop ... contains some of the most luminous and quietly compelling poems you’ll come across on either side of the Atlantic." In a Valley of This Restless Mind has been called "a collection of high seriousness" and compared to the poetry of Elizabeth Jennings.

Works
"The Ophthalmologist" (1987)
The Shanghai Owner of the Bonsai Shop (1991, Enitharmon)
In a Valley of This Restless Mind (1997, Enitharmon)
Imperium (2005, Enitharmon)
Exile and the Kingdom (2016, Enitharmon)

References

External links

1954 births
Living people
Alumni of Wadham College, Oxford
English women poets
British literary critics
British women literary critics
English translators
Writers from London
English women non-fiction writers